Mohamad Zbida (born 20 May 1990 in Damascus, Syria) is a Syrian footballer. He currently plays for Al-Jaish, which competes in the Syrian Premier League, the top division in Syria. He plays as a defender.

Club career
Zbida started his professional career with Al-Wahda in the 2007–08 Syrian Premier League season.
On 27 May 2010, he moved to Al-Jaish in the Syrian Premier League and signed a 3-year contract.

International career
Between 2007 and 2008, he played for the Under-17 and the Under-19 Syrian national team, including the Syrian U-17 national team that participated in the FIFA U-17 World Cup 2007 in South Korea.

He plays against Argentina, Spain and Honduras in the group-stage of the FIFA U-17 World Cup 2007 and against England in the Round of 16.

Zbida was part of the Syrian U-19 squad in the 2008 AFC U-19 Championship where he played in all three group games.

Honour and Titles

National Team
FIFA U-17 World Cup 2007: Round of 16

References

External links
 Career stats at goalzz.com
 Career stats at Kooora.com (Arabic)

1990 births
Living people
Sportspeople from Damascus
Association football defenders
Syrian footballers
Al-Jaish Damascus players
Al-Wahda
Syrian Premier League players
Syria international footballers